Long Key State Park is a  Florida State Park located on Long Key, one of the Florida Keys, in Monroe County, Florida, United States.  It is at mile marker 67.5 on U.S. 1, 67400 Overseas Highway.

History
Prehistoric coral reefs grew here over the course of millennia, when the sea level was over  deeper. The remnants came to form Long Key, and the rest of the Florida Keys.

The climate and waters provided abundant plant and aquatic life for the Calusa, who settled in the area long before Spanish explorers arrived.

"Cayo Vivora", or Rattlesnake Key, is what the first Spaniards called the island, since to them it resembled a snake with its jaws open.

By the early twentieth century, Long Key became an important depot for the completed Key West Extension of the Florida East Coast Railroad. The railroad's founder, Henry Flagler, also established the Long Key Fishing Camp, a resort that attracted the greatest saltwater fishermen from around the world. But it did not last for long, when in 1935, the Labor Day hurricane devastated the Club, the railroad, and much of the Keys.

The land that came to comprise the park was acquired between 1961 and 1973, with the official opening in 1969.

Biology
The plant life at Long Key originated in the Caribbean. Trees include mangrove, West Indian mahogany (Swietenia mahagoni), Jamaica fish poisontree (Piscidia piscipula), poisonwood (Metopium toxiferum), gumbo-limbo (Bursera simaruba) and oysterwood (Gymnanthes lucida).

The shallow waters are a haven for saltwater fish and other marine life. Numerous wading birds can be seen, especially during the winter.

Gallery

Recreational activities
Activities include swimming, snorkeling, kayaking, picnicking, hiking, and birding as well as full facility camping. Amenities include two nature trails (The Golden Orb Trail, and Layton Trail), picnic areas, restrooms, and 60 full-facility campsites.

References

 Molloy, Jonny "The Best in Tent Camping Florida". p. 153.

External links
 Long Key State Park at Florida State Parks
 Long Key State Park at State Parks
 Long Key State Park at Absolutely Florida

State parks of Florida
Parks in the Florida Keys
Beaches of Monroe County, Florida
Tourist attractions in the Florida Keys
Protected areas established in 1969
Parks in Monroe County, Florida
Beaches of Florida